Aprosopus barbatulus is a species of beetle in the family Cerambycidae. It was described by Martins and Galileo in 2013.

References

Agapanthiini
Beetles described in 2013